In tennis, the eighth edition of the US Open Series (known as Olympus US Open Series for sponsorships reasons), includes ten hard court tournaments that start on July 18, 2011 in Atlanta and will end in Winston-Salem for the men and in New Haven for the women on August 28, 2011. This edition has scheduled five separate men's tournaments, four women's tournaments, and the Western & Southern Open that will host both a men's and women's event. The series includes two ATP World Tour Masters 1000 and two WTA Premier 5 events to headline the series.

Point distribution for series events 

To be included in the standings and subsequently the bonus prize money, a player has to have countable results from two different tournaments. Players finishing in the top three in the series can earn up to $1 million in extra prize money at the US Open. Roger Federer received the largest US Open pay day of $2.4 million in 2007 after capturing the title in both the US Open Series and the US Open championship.

US Open Series standings
The standings below include all players who have received points from at least two tournaments in the US Open Series.

ATP

 as of August 16, 2011

Notes
1 – Tours – Number of tournaments in US Open Series in which a player has reached the quarterfinals or better, in 250 and 500 series events or the Round of 16 in ATP World Tour Masters 1000 events.

WTA

as of August 16, 2011

Notes
1 – Tours – Number of tournaments in US Open Series in which a player has reached the quarterfinals or better, in Premier events; or the Round of 16 or better in Premier 5 events.

2011 schedule

Week 1

ATP – Atlanta Tennis Championships

Defending champion, Mardy Fish, last year's finalist, John Isner, and 2010 semifinalist, Kevin Anderson, headlined the event. Isner was nearly the first big upset of the tournament, needing nearly three hours to defeat fellow American James Blake in the second round. Nineteen-year-old Ryan Harrison reached his first ATP Tour semifinal, but ultimately fell to Fish who defeated Isner in a rematch of last year's final.

Main Draw Finals

Week 2

ATP – Farmers Classic

Atlanta champion, Mardy Fish, and 2009 US Open champion, Juan Martín del Potro, headlined the event. Despite being unseeded, Lu Yen-hsun and Ryan Harrison brought their good form from Atlanta to achieve consecutive quarterfinal appearances in the Series. Fish also continued on with his good form, extending his winning streak to seven matches. He was joined by three unseeded players in the semifinals, including Ernests Gulbis, who went on to upset Fish in the final.

Main Draw Finals

WTA – Bank of the West Classic

Defending champion, Victoria Azarenka, last year's finalist, Maria Sharapova, and 13-time Grand Slam champion, Serena Williams, headlined the event. Playing her first tournament on American soil since 2009, Williams showed excellent form, serving bagels in her opening round match, and followed that win by upsetting Sharapova in the quarterfinals. With Azarenka's exit in the second round, Marion Bartoli took advantage of the open draw and advanced to the final. In only her third tournament of the year, Williams defeated Bartoli to take the title.

Main Draw Finals

Week 3

ATP – Legg Mason Tennis Classic

Gaël Monfils and defending champion, David Nalbandian, headlined the event. Atlanta champion, Mardy Fish, who also reached the final of the Farmers Classic, was forced to withdraw from the tournament, citing a bruised right heel. Serbian duo, Viktor Troicki and Janko Tipsarević, who were expected to reach the quarterfinals because of their seedings, joined the lower-ranked American duo, John Isner and Donald Young, in the final eight. Radek Štěpánek took advantage of Fish's withdrawal from the tournament and advanced to the final, where he took out top seed Monfils for his fifth title of his career.

Main Draw Finals

WTA – Mercury Insurance Open

Vera Zvonareva, Andrea Petkovic, and former world number one, Ana Ivanovic, headlined the event. Sloane Stephens' upset over Julia Görges resulted in the American wildcard being the only unseeded player in the final eight, while Ivanovic's upset over Peng Shuai spoiled a semifinal lineup of the top four seeds. Despite sustaining a shoulder injury earlier in the tournament, Agnieszka Radwańska was able to reach the final for the second consecutive year and defeat top-seed, Zvonareva, for the title.

Main Draw Finals

Week 4

ATP – Rogers Cup

Novak Djokovic, Rafael Nadal, Roger Federer, and two-time defending champion, Andy Murray, headlined the event. Murray and Nadal suffered the first upsets of the tournament, with Murray losing badly to South Africa's Kevin Anderson and Nadal falling to Ivan Dodig after the Croat pulled off a comeback win. Federer followed suit, losing in the third round to Jo-Wilfried Tsonga for the second consecutive time in the third round, while Djokovic improved on his win and loss record of the year to 52-1. Atlanta champion and Washington runner-up, Mardy Fish, continued on with his good form on the Series advancing to his third consecutive final. In the final, Djokovic won his 53rd match of the year, defeating Fish 6-4 in the third set.

Main Draw Finals

WTA – Rogers Cup

The top 20, including Caroline Wozniacki, Kim Clijsters, and Maria Sharapova, along with Stanford champion, Serena Williams, headlined the event. Despite a long lay-off due to a foot injury, Clijsters was once again forced to retire from her opening round match citing an abdominal injury. The tournament suffered the loss of another headliner early on as defending champion, Wozniacki, was knocked out in the second round. The third round brought about more upsets, as the number three seed, Vera Zvonareva, and Sharapova lost to Agnieszka Radwańska and Galina Voskoboeva, respectively. Despite losing only six games en route to the semifinals, fourth seed, Victoria Azarenka, lost in straight sets to Stanford champion, Williams, who extended her win streak to ten matches. Williams won her second tournament of the Series, defeating Samantha Stosur in the final.

Main Draw Finals

Week 5

ATP – Western & Southern Open

Montreal champion, Novak Djokovic, Rafael Nadal, defending champion, Roger Federer, and Atlanta champion, Mardy Fish, headlined the event. The top eight seeds cruised to the quarterfinals with exception to fifth-seeded, David Ferrer, who lost his third round match to Gilles Simon. The quarterfinals brought a pair of upsets as former world number ones, Rafael Nadal and Roger Federer, bowed out to Fish and Tomáš Berdych, respectively. Neither player could follow up the win, and instead, Andy Murray handed Djokovic his second loss of the year after the world number one was forced to retire from the championship match.

Main Draw Finals

WTA - Western & Southern Open

Caroline Wozniacki, Vera Zvonareva, Maria Sharapova, and Stanford and Toronto champion, Serena Williams, headlined the event. Wozniacki lost her opening match for the second tournament in a row, losing to American wildcard, Christina McHale, while Williams was forced to withdraw from the tournament, citing a toe injury. Russians, Zvonareva and Sharapova, advanced to the semifinals without dropping a set, joining lower-seeded players, Andrea Petković and Jelena Janković in the final four. In a battle of former world number ones, Sharapova defeated Janković in a three-set thriller.

Main Draw Finals

Week 6

ATP - Winston-Salem Open

Former world number one, Andy Roddick, and fellow American, John Isner, headlined the event. Where the top half of the draw held to seeds through to the semifinals, the bottom half of the draw saw qualifier, Julien Benneteau, advance to the final. Isner defeated Benneteau to secure a third-place finish in the Series.

Main Draw Finals

WTA - New Haven Open at Yale

Three-time defending champion, Caroline Wozniacki, and French Open finalists, Li Na and Francesca Schiavone, headlined the event. Agnieszka Radwańska had the chance to win the Series if she advanced to the final, but lost to Petra Cetkovská in the second round. Cetkovská's run of good form continued on to the final where she faced world number one, Wozniacki. Wozniacki defeated Cetkovská for a fourth consecutive title in New Haven.

Main Draw Finals

References
 US Open Series Tournaments

External links